Tucker Bone (born January 23, 1996) is an American soccer player who currently plays for USL Championship side Sacramento Republic.

Career

College
Bone played college soccer at the United States Air Force Academy between 2015 and 2018. While with the Falcons, Bone made 81 appearances, scoring 25 goals and tallying 22 assists.

While at college, Bone also appeared for USL PDL team Colorado Pride Switchbacks U23 during their 2018 season.

Professional
On January 11, 2019, Bone was drafted 20th overall in the 2019 MLS SuperDraft by Seattle Sounders FC. Due to his potential service commitments with the United States Air Force, Seattle would have to demonstrate a serious interest in Bone for him to qualify for a special military program that allows active duty service members to keep training as elite level athletes.

After not signing with Seattle, Bone joined USL Championship side Colorado Springs Switchbacks on June 14, 2019.

On December 10, 2019, Bone joined USL Championship side Reno 1868 ahead of their 2020 season. Reno folded their team on November 6, 2020, due to the financial impact of the COVID-19 pandemic.

Bone signed with USL Championship side Sacramento Republic on January 19, 2021.

References

External links

1996 births
Living people
American soccer players
Association football midfielders
Air Force Falcons men's soccer players
Seattle Sounders FC draft picks
Colorado Springs Switchbacks FC players
Reno 1868 FC players
Sacramento Republic FC players
People from Granite Bay, California
Soccer players from California
Sportspeople from Greater Sacramento
USL League Two players
USL Championship players
All-American men's college soccer players